Amiya may refer to:

 Amaya (disambiguation)

See also
 Amya (disambiguation)